Spain competed at the 1990 European Athletics Championships in Split, then Yugoslavia, from 26 August to 2 September 1990.

Medals

Results

Men
Track & road events

Field events

Combined events – Decathlon

Women
Track & road events

Field events

Nations at the 1990 European Athletics Championships
1990
European Athletics Championships